The Halifax Rifles (RCAC) is a Canadian Army regiment that served between the years of 1860 and 1965 before being reduced to nil strength and placed on the Supplementary Order of Battle. The regiment was reactivated on May 10, 2009, as a reserve force unit performing the role of armoured reconnaissance. It is the first and only regiment since the 1960s to be reactivated from the Supplementary Order of Battle.

The unit draws its history from the 19th century Halifax Volunteer Battalion which was active at the time of the Fenian Raids. It received its current name in May 1958.

History

Fenian Raids

The Halifax Volunteer Battalion was called out on active service on 6 June 1866. The battalion, which guarded the Halifax Dockyard, was removed from active service on 31 July 1866.

North West Rebellion

The 63rd The Halifax Battalion of Rifles mobilized three companies for active service on 10 April 1885 which served with the Halifax Provisional Battalion in the Alberta Column of the North-West Field Force. The companies were removed from active service on 24 July 1885.

South African War
The 63rd The Halifax Battalion of Rifles contributed volunteers for the Canadian Contingents during the South African War.

Great War

Details of the 63rd Regiment "Halifax Rifles" were placed on active service on 6 August 1914 for local protective duty.

The 40th Battalion (Nova Scotia), CEF, was authorized on 7 November 1914 and embarked for Britain on 18 October 1915. The battalion provided reinforcements to the Canadian Corps in the field until 4 January 1917, when its personnel were absorbed by the 26th Reserve Battalion, CEF. The battalion was disbanded on 17 July 1917.

Second World War
Details from the regiment were called out on service on 26 August 1939 and then placed on active service on 1 September 1939 as The Halifax Rifles, CASF (Details), for local protection duties. which were disbanded on 31 December 1940. The regiment mobilized the 1st Battalion, The Halifax Rifles, CASF for active service on 1 January 1941. It was converted to armour and redesignated as the 23rd Army Tank Battalion (The Halifax Rifles), CAC, CASF, on 26 January 1942 and the 23rd Army Tank Regiment (The Halifax Rifles), CAC, CASF, on 15 May 1942. It embarked for Britain on 17 June 1943 as a unit of the 2nd Army Tank Brigade, 4th Canadian Armoured Division, where it provided reinforcements to units of the Canadian Corps in the field. The overseas regiment was disbanded on 1 November 1943.

War in Afghanistan
The regiment contributed personnel to the various task forces which served in Afghanistan between 2009 and 2014.

Mission task
Since 2015, Army Reserve units have been assigned specific mission tasks, in addition to traditional military duties.  Trained and promoted in the traditional officer and non-commissioned member streams of the Royal Canadian Armoured Corps, regiment members are additionally trained to be fully integrated, as a formed entity, into similarly assigned Regular Force units.  The mission task for the Halifax Rifles is called Influence Activities.  By their Canadian Forces organization order (CFOO), a squadron of up to 52 members will be trained in the employment of population group influence techniques, including psychological operations and civil-military co-operation, to provide behavioural and psychological effects on those populations in support of a commander’s intent or mission.

Lineage

The Halifax Rifles (RCAC)
Originated 14 May 1860 in Halifax, Nova Scotia as the Halifax Volunteer Battalion
Redesignated 28 May 1869 as the Halifax Volunteer Battalion of Rifles
Redesignated 5 November 1869 as the 63rd The Halifax Volunteer Battalion of Rifles
Redesignated 13 May 1870 as the 63rd The Halifax Battalion of Rifles
Redesignated 8 May 1900 as the 63rd Regiment "Halifax Rifles"
Redesignated 15 May 1920 as The Halifax Rifles
Redesignated 1 January 1941 as the 2nd (Reserve) Battalion, The Halifax Rifles
Redesignated 15 September 1944 as The Halifax Rifles (Reserve)
Redesignated 30 November 1945 as The Halifax Rifles
1 April 1946 converted to armour and redesignated as the 23rd Armoured Regiment (Halifax Rifles), RCAC'
Redesignated 4 February 1949 as The Halifax Rifles (23rd Armoured Regiment)
Redesignated 19 May 1958 The Halifax Rifles (RCAC)
Reduced to nil strength and transferred to the Supplementary Order of Battle on 31 January 1965
Removed from the Supplementary Order of Battle and reactivated as a Canadian Army Reserve Force regiment on 28 July 2009

Lineage chart

Perpetuations

Great War
40th Battalion (Nova Scotia), CEF

Alliances 

 United Kingdom - None at present

Battle honours

In the list below, battle honours in capitals were awarded for participation in large operations and campaigns, while those in lowercase indicate honours granted for more specific battles.

War of 1812
Honorary distinction: The non-emblazonable honorary distinction DEFENCE OF CANADA – 1812–1815 –  (awarded in commemoration of the Nova Scotia Fencible Infantry).

North West Rebellion
NORTH WEST CANADA, 1885

South African War
SOUTH AFRICA, 1899–1900

Great War
MOUNT SORREL 2–13 June 1916
SOMME, 1916 1 July–18 November 1916
ARRAS, 1917, '18 8 April–4 May 1917 and  26 August–3 September 1918
YPRES, 1917 31 July–10 November 1917
HILL 70 15–25 August 1917
AMIENS 8–11 August 1918
HINDENBURG LINE 12 September–9 October 1918
PURSUIT TO MONS 28 September–11 November 1918

See also 

Military history of Nova Scotia

Order of precedence

Notes and references

Canadian Forces Publication A-DH-267-003 Insignia and Lineages of the Canadian Forces. Volume 3: Combat Arms Regiments.

Further reading
A Century of Rifles 1860 – 1960. The Halifax Rifles (R.C.A.C) (M) 'Cede Nullis' by John Gordon Quigley (Jan 1 1960)

External links
The Halifax Rifles (RCAC) Official Home Page

Armoured regiments of Canada
Rifle regiments of Canada
Military units and formations of Nova Scotia
Military units and formations established in 1860
British colonial regiments
Supplementary Order of Battle